The Ferrari SF90 Stradale (Type F173) is a mid-engine PHEV (Plug-in Hybrid Electric Vehicle) sports car produced by the Italian automobile manufacturer Ferrari. The car shares its name with the SF90 Formula One car with SF90 standing for the 90th anniversary of the Scuderia Ferrari racing team and "Stradale" meaning "made for the road".

Specifications

Battery and driving modes
The car has a 7.9 kWh lithium-ion battery for regenerative braking, giving the car  of electric range. The car comes with four driving modes depending on road conditions. The modes are changed by the eManettino knob present on the steering wheel.

The eDrive mode runs the car only on the electric motors. The Hybrid mode runs the car on both the internal combustion engine and the electric motors and is the car's default mode. In this mode, the car's onboard computer (called control logic) also turns off the engine if the conditions are ideal in order to save fuel while allowing the driver to start the engine again. The Performance mode keeps the engine running in order to charge the batteries and keeps the car responsive in order for optimum performance. The Qualify mode uses the powertrain to its full potential.

The control logic system makes use of three primary areas: the high-voltage controls of the car (including the batteries), the RAC-e (Rotation Axis Control-electric) torque vectoring system, and the MGUK along with the engine and gearbox.

Powertrain

The engine is an evolution of the unit found in the 488 Pista and the F8 Tributo models. The intake and exhaust of the engine have been completely modified. The assembly for the turbochargers is lower than that of the exhaust system and the engine sits  lower in the chassis than the other mid-engine V8 models in order to maintain a lower centre of gravity. The engine utilises a smaller flywheel and an inconel exhaust manifold.

The front wheels are powered by two electric motors (one for each wheel), providing torque vectoring. They also function as the reversing gear, as the main transmission (eight-speed dual-clutch) does not have a reversing gear.

Transmission
The engine of the SF90 Stradale is mated to a new 8-speed dual-clutch transmission. The new transmission is  lighter and more compact than the existing 7-speed transmission used by the other offerings of the manufacturer partly due to the absence of a dedicated reverse gear since reversing is provided by the electric motors mounted on the front axle. The new transmission also has a 30% faster shift time (200 milliseconds).

Interior 
A 16-inch curved display located behind the steering wheel displays various vital statistics of the car to the driver. The car also employs a new head-up display that would reconfigure itself according to the selected driving mode. The steering wheel is carried over from the F8 but now features multiple capacitive touch interfaces to control the various functions of the car. Other conventional levers and buttons are retained. The interior will also channel sound of the engine to the driver according to the manufacturer.

Handling
The SF90 Stradale employs eSSC (electric Side Slip Control) which controls the torque distribution to all four wheels of the car. The eSSC is combined with eTC (electric Tractional Control), a new brake-by-wire system which combines the traditional hydraulic braking system and electric motors to provide optimal regenerative braking and torque vectoring.

Chassis
The car's all-new chassis combines aluminium and carbon fibre to improve structural rigidity and provide a suitable platform for the car's hybrid system. The car has a total dry weight of  after combining the  weight of the electric system.

Performance
It is the fastest Ferrari road car on their Fiorano Circuit as of 2020, seven tenths of a second faster than the LaFerrari.

Design
The manufacturer claims that the SF90 Stradale can generate  of downforce at  due to new findings in aero and thermal dynamics.

The main feature of the design is the twin-part rear wing which is an application of the drag reduction system (DRS) used in Formula One. A fixed element in the wing incorporates the rear light, the mobile parts of the wing (called "shut off Gurney" by the manufacturer) integrate into the body by using electric actuators in order to maximise downforce. The SF90 Stradale uses an evolution of Ferrari's vortex generators mounted at the front of the car.

The car employs a cab-forward design in order to utilise the new aerodynamic parts of the car more effectively and in order to incorporate radiators or the cooling requirements of the hybrid system of the car. The design is a close collaboration between Ferrari Styling Centre and Ferrari engineers.

The rear-end of the car carries over many iconic Ferrari Styling elements such as the flying buttresses. The engine cover has been kept as low as possible in order to maximise airflow. According to the car's lead designer, Flavio Manzoni, the car's design lies in between that of a spaceship and of a race car. The rear side-profile harkens back to the 1960s 330 P3/4.

Variants

SF90 Spider
The SF90 Spider is an open-top variant of the SF90 Stradale equipped with a retractable hardtop. It is the first Ferrari plug-in hybrid car offered as an open-top variant. It is also the most powerful non-limited convertible car in the world, having a combined power of 1,000 PS. The previous record was held by the Ferrari 812 GTS. Performance is very similar to the closed-body variant and on par with LaFerrari Aperta.

Assetto Fiorano
The Assetto Fiorano is a racing modification pack for the Ferrari  SF90 Stradale or Spider. It uses racing-derived Multimatic shocks and lightweight carbon fibre parts embedded in the door panels and underbody. The Assetto Fiorano also employs a lightweight titanium exhaust system. These measures save  compared to the standard SF90 Stradale.SF90 Assetto Fiorano has Carbon wheels too.

Versione Speciale

See also 

 List of production cars by power output

References

External links

 Ferrari SF90 Stradale official website
 Ferrari SF90 Spider official website

2020s cars
SF90 Stradale
Rear mid-engine, all-wheel-drive vehicles
Flagship vehicles
Plug-in hybrid vehicles
Sports cars
Cars introduced in 2019